This is a list of the most common surnames (also called last names or family names) in North America.

Canada

Québec 
Top 10 common surnames in Quebec as of 2006.

Costa Rica 
Most common surnames in Costa Rica as of 2007.

Cuba 
Most common surnames in Cuba.

Dominican Republic

El Salvador 
Most common surnames in El Salvador as of 2005.

Guatemala 
Most common surnames in Guatemala as of 2015.

Mexico 
Below are the most common surnames of Mexico. All of the surnames listed are of Spanish origin.

United States 

All figures are for the 2000 United States census, except for the 1990 Rank column which is for the 1990 United States census.

The distribution of U.S. surnames reflects the history of immigration into the country. Many immigrants from non-English-speaking countries Anglicized their names. Some examples of this are the popular Swedish name Johansson which was frequently changed to Johnson, and the German Müller which became Miller. Some very common Swedish names were so similar that only a minor change of spelling was necessary, such as Andersson and Jonsson, which is why these names are much more common in the U.S. than in the United Kingdom. British surnames such as Williams, Jackson, Robinson, Harris, Davis, Brown and Jones are also common among people of non-British descent, such as African Americans due to slavery.

Garcia and Martinez represent the rapid growth of several Hispanic communities in the United States. According to the above table, from the 2000 U.S. census, 17.11% of Americans have a surname among the top 100. On the other hand, 13.97% of Americans have a surname which occurs fewer than 100 times in the entire population.

Top surnames according to the 2010 U.S. census may be found here.

During the 2000 U.S. census, the top one hundred surnames in the U.S. were:

See also 

 List of family name affixes
 List of most popular given names
 Lists of most common surnames, for other continents

References

Further reading
 Popular baby names by decade and states—US Social Security Administration
 Most common male, female first and last names—U.S. Census 1990
 Top 1000 names, surnames occurring 100 or more times—US Census 2000
 CMU AI Repository Names Corpus

External links
 "How Popular is Your Last Name?" searchable data base from 1990 and 2000 U.S. Census, on PBS.org

North America
Surnames, most common
Surnames of North American origin
Surnames, common